Paralamiodorcadion schmidi is a species of beetle in the family Cerambycidae, and the only species in the genus Paralamiodorcadion. It was described by Stephan von Breuning in 1967.

References

Lamiinae
Beetles described in 1967
Taxa named by Stephan von Breuning (entomologist)